Heart Mountain is an 8,123-foot (2,476 m) klippe just north of Cody in the U.S. state of Wyoming, rising from the floor of the Bighorn Basin. The mountain is composed of limestone and dolomite of Ordovician through Mississippian age (about 500 to 350 million years old), but it rests on the Willwood Formation, rocks that are about 55 million years old—rock on the summit of Heart Mountain is thus almost 300 million years older than the rocks at the base. For over one hundred years, geologists have tried to understand how these older rocks came to rest on much younger strata.

The carbonate rocks that form Heart Mountain were deposited on a basement of ancient (more than 2.5 billion years old) granite when the area was covered by a large shallow tropical sea. Up until 50 million years ago, these rocks lay about 25 miles (40 kilometers) to the northwest, where the eastern Absaroka Range now stands.

Between 75 and 50 million years ago, a period of mountain-building called the Laramide Orogeny caused uplift of the Beartooth Range and subsidence of the Bighorn and Absaroka Basins. Just south of the Beartooth Range, this orogeny uplifted an elongate, somewhat lower plateau which sloped gently to the southeast toward the Bighorn Basin and to the south toward the Absaroka Basin. Immediately following this period of mountain-building, volcanic eruptions began to form the now extinct volcanoes of the Absaroka Range that lie to the south of the Beartooths and extend into Yellowstone National Park. Between 50 and 48 million years ago a sheet of rock about 500 square miles (1,300 square kilometers) in area detached from the plateau south of the Beartooths and slid tens of kilometers to the southeast and south into the Bighorn and Absaroka Basins. Although the slope was less than 2 degrees, the front of the landslide traveled at least 25 miles (40 km) and the slide mass ended up covering over 1,300 square miles (>3,400 km2). This is by far the largest rockslide known on land on the surface of the earth and is comparable in scale to some of the largest known submarine landslides.

Many models have been proposed to explain what caused this huge slab of rocks to start sliding and what allowed it to slide so far on such a low slope, fragmenting, thinning and extending as it went. Most geologists who have worked in the area agree that Absaroka volcanism played a role in the sliding and many suggest that a major volcanic or steam explosion initiated movement. Another model involves injection of numerous igneous dikes with the resulting heating of water within pores in rocks causing an increase in pressure which initiated sliding. Some geologists have suggested that hot pressurized water (hydrothermal fluids), derived from a volcano which sat north of Cooke City, Montana, effectively lubricated the sliding surface. Another possibility is that once the slide was moving, friction heated the limestone along the sliding surface, creating pseudotachylite, which then further broke down to calcium oxide and carbon dioxide gas (or supercritical fluid). The gas supported the slide in the way that air pressure supports a hovercraft, allowing the slide to move easily down the very low slope. When the rockslide stopped, the carbon dioxide cooled and recombined with calcium oxide to form the cement-like carbonate rock now found in the fault zone.

In the 48 million years since the slide occurred, erosion has removed most of the portion of the slide sheet which moved out into the Bighorn Basin, leaving just one big block of carbonate rocks—Heart Mountain. Farther south, a large block of carbonate rock forms Sheep Mountain, which lies just south of the road that goes from Cody into Yellowstone Park. Some of the best views of the sliding surface, called the Heart Mountain fault, can be found along the Chief Joseph Highway (Wyoming Highway 296).

The nearby Heart Mountain War Relocation Center, where a number of Japanese Americans were interned during World War II, was named after the peak.

See also

 Storegga Slide
 Chief Mountain

References 

Mountains of Wyoming
Geography of Park County, Wyoming
Mountains of Park County, Wyoming
Landslides in the United States